Phil Morris (born April 4, 1959) is an American actor. He played Jackie Chiles on Seinfeld, John Jones on The CW series Smallville and  Silas Stone in Doom Patrol. He also voiced Doc Saturday on The Secret Saturdays and Dr. Joshua Strongbear Sweet in Atlantis: The Lost Empire and related media.

Early life
Morris is the son of actor Greg Morris (1933–1996). His paternal grandfather was jazz trumpeter Francis Williams. Phil Morris has two siblings, one of whom is actress Iona Morris.

His father was best known for appearing in the TV series Mission: Impossible, during the show's full run from 1966 to 1973. His father was friends with other successful African American actors, including Sidney Poitier and Bill Cosby, and Phil grew up viewing them as role models. His father was also good friends with Mission: Impossible lead Peter Graves, whom Morris came to consider his acting mentor. Through his childhood, Morris knew Graves' real-life children. The friendship continued, until Peter Graves' death on March 14, 2010, which devastated Morris.

Career
Morris's first acting role was as a child when he appeared in the 1966 Star Trek episode "Miri." Star Trek was, at the time, shot at the same studio (Desilu Productions) that produced Mission: Impossible.

He made his feature film debut in Star Trek III: The Search for Spock in a small role and later guest starred on Babylon 5, Star Trek: Deep Space Nine, and Star Trek: Voyager.

In the mid 1980's, he portrayed law student (later attorney) Tyrone Jackson in The Young and the Restless.  During a major story line, his character used heavy theatrical makeup to appear Caucasian, in order to go undercover to expose an organized crime organization. In the 1990's, Morris played a recurring character, the Johnnie Cochran-inspired defense attorney Jackie Chiles, on the comedy Seinfeld. The episode "The Abstinence" depicts Chiles suing a tobacco company, which Morris said he took great pleasure in, having been made fun of his whole life due to having the same name as the tobacco brand Philip Morris. Morris also co-starred in the TV remake of Mission: Impossible as tech wizard Grant Collier (son of Barney Collier, who was played in the original series by Morris's real-life father Greg Morris). He voiced the supporting role of Dr. Sweet in Disney's 2001 film Atlantis: The Lost Empire as well as its 2003 sequel, Atlantis: Milo's Return. He played one of Will Smith's college professors on the NBC show The Fresh Prince of Bel-Air and played Dr. Clay Spencer on the then-UPN television show Girlfriends.

Morris portrayed the DC Comics superhero Martian Manhunter on the TV series Smallville, starting in the sixth-season episode "Labyrinth" in 2007. He reprised that role on the show's sixth-season finale, as well as the episodes "Bizarro" and "Cure" in the seventh season, the episodes "Odyssey", "Prey" and "Bulletproof" in the eighth season, and the episodes "Absolute Justice", "Checkmate" and "Salvation" in the ninth season.

As a voice actor, he portrayed the villains Imperiex on Legion of Superheroes, and as the Immortal Caveman Vandal Savage on Justice League and Justice League: Doom. He voiced W'Kabi in the animated series Black Panther. He appeared on one episode each of the series CSI: Miami and Seven Days. Though largely unnoticed, Morris also was the voice of Paul the Apostle in Zondervan's The Bible Experience. Morris also made a cameo appearance as Miles Dyson in photographs in the television series Terminator: The Sarah Connor Chronicles. He provided the voice of the character Doc Saturday in the animated show The Secret Saturdays. He also played a major supporting role in the PlayStation 2 game Ratchet: Deadlocked, as Merc, one of the combat bots that accompany the main character Ratchet. He also worked as a voice actor on The PJs; according to Morris, co-creator and star Eddie Murphy didn't want to show up on some days to record the voice of Thurgood Stubbs, so the producers hired Morris to record Thurgood's lines, where he worked in a separate booth with the other actors, allowing the producers to replace Morris' recordings with Murphy's voice in case Murphy decided he wanted to record his dialogue. He did several voices in the animated film Dead Space: Downfall as Hansen and Glenn. He played Delroy Jones on the TV One series Love That Girl!, Saint Walker on the Cartoon Network series Green Lantern: The Animated Series, and Ultra Richard on the Cartoon Hangover series SuperF*ckers. He also voices Plank in the Sofia the First episode "The Floating Palace", Green Arrow and Hawkman in the film Lego DC Comics Super Heroes: Justice League vs. Bizarro League and Vandal Savage in the film Lego DC Comics Super Heroes: Justice League: Cosmic Clash.

Personal life
Morris has been married to interior designer Carla Gittelson since 1983. Together they have two children. He is a practitioner of Wing Chun under Sifu Hawkins Cheung.

Filmography

Film

Television

Video games

References

External links

 

20th-century American male actors
21st-century American male actors
Living people
African-American male actors
American male child actors
American male film actors
American male television actors
American male voice actors
American Wing Chun practitioners
20th-century African-American people
21st-century African-American people
1959 births